Concerto for Double String Orchestra may refer to:
 Concerto for Double String Orchestra (Tippett), by Michael Tippett
 Double Concerto for Two String Orchestras, Piano, and Timpani (Martinů), by Bohuslav Martinů
 Partita for Double String Orchestra, by Ralph Vaughan Williams